The 1980–81 season of Hertha BSC started on 6 August against VfB Oldenburg.

Review and events
This was the final season of the original two region 2. Bundesliga, as the DFB sought to integrate the North and South divisions into a single division for the next campaign. This meant 12 clubs from the North would be relegated to the Oberliga. At the end of the season, the club finished third, scoring 123 goals (leading the league), giving up 42 goals (only Werder Bremen gave up fewer), having the best goal difference and missed the playoff by a point.

Results

Legend

2. Bundesliga Nord

DFB-Pokal

Player information

Transfers
Source:

Roster and statistics
Sources
League:
DFB-Pokal:

Sources

Match reports

Other sources

External links

Hertha BSC seasons
Hertha